Wallace Carlton "Ralph" Palmer (born May 8, 1895) was an American college football, basketball and baseball player and coach. He served as the head football coach at Tusculum College in Greenville, Tennessee from 1926 to 1928. He previously served as the head men's basketball coach (1917–1918) and baseball coach (1918) at Vanderbilt University.

References

1895 births
Year of death missing
Illinois Tech Scarlet Hawks football players
Tusculum Pioneers athletic directors
Tusculum Pioneers football coaches
Tusculum Pioneers men's basketball coaches
Vanderbilt Commodores baseball coaches
Vanderbilt Commodores men's basketball coaches
People from Salamanca, New York
Basketball coaches from New York (state)